Hugo van den Eynde (1488 – around 1566) was a Dutch statesman, and Pensionary of Delft. He was succeeded in this position by his son Jacob van den Eynde.

Van den Eynde was born in Delft to Jacob Dircksz. van den Eynde. His father was an alderman of Delft. He married Lysbeth Jansdochter van der Sluys (or van Zijl), also known as Elisabeth van der Sluys, the daughter of an alderman of Rotterdam. He beget several children, including Jacob van den Eynde.

On April 20, 1520, Van den Eynde was received as advocaat by the Federal Court of Holland. Shortly afterwards, he returned to his native Delft, where he became secretary. In 1526 he succeeded Aert van der Goes as Pensionary of Delft, a position he held until 1552. From 1544 until 1552, he acted as Pensionary with the assistance of his son Jacob.

Jacob later became Grand pensionary of Holland, the highest official in the County of Holland. His grandson was Jhr. Jacob van den Eynde, governor of Woerden, father of the poet Jacobus Eyndius (or Jacob van den Eynde), Lord of Haamstede, and captain under Maurice, Prince of Orange.

References

 
 

1488 births
1566 deaths
Year of birth uncertain
16th-century Dutch lawyers
Dutch politicians
People from Delft